Feathery hydroid is a common name for several hydroids and may refer to:

Aglaophenia
Plumularia
Pycnotheca mirabilis
Sertularia